In investing and finance, the low-volatility anomaly is the observation that low-volatility stocks have higher returns than high-volatility stocks in most markets studied. This is an example of a stock market anomaly since it contradicts the central prediction of many financial theories that taking higher risk must be compensated with higher returns. 

Furthermore, the Capital Asset Pricing Model (CAPM) predicts a positive relation between the systematic risk-exposure of a stock (also known as the stock beta) and its expected future returns. However, some narratives of the low-volatility anomaly falsify this prediction of the CAPM by showing that stocks with higher beta have historically under-performed the stocks with lower beta.

Other narratives of this anomaly show that even stocks with higher idiosyncratic risk are compensated with lower returns in comparison to stocks with lower idiosyncratic risk.

The low-volatility anomaly has also been referred to as the low-beta, minimum-variance, minimum volatility anomaly.

History 
The CAPM was developed in the late 1960s and predicts that expected returns should be a positive and linear function of beta, and nothing else. First, the return of a stock with average beta should be the average return of stocks. Second, the intercept should be equal to the risk-free rate. Then the slope can be computed from these two points. Almost immediately these predictions were empirically challenged. Studies find that the correct slope is either less than predicted, not significantly different from zero, or even negative. Economist Fischer Black (1972) proposed a theory where there is a zero-beta return which is different from the risk-free return. This fits the data better since the zero-beta return is different from the risk-free return. It still presumes, on principle, that there is higher return for higher beta. Research challenging CAPM's underlying assumptions about risk has been mounting for decades. One challenge was in 1972, when Michael C. Jensen, Fischer Black and Myron Scholes published a study showing what CAPM would look like if one could not borrow at a risk-free rate. Their results indicated that the relationship between beta and realized return was flatter than predicted by CAPM. Shortly after, Robert Haugen and James Heins produced a working paper titled “On the Evidence Supporting the Existence of Risk Premiums in the Capital Market”. Studying the period from 1926 to 1971, they concluded that "over the long run stock portfolios with lesser variance in monthly returns have experienced greater average returns than their ‘riskier’ counterparts".

Evidence 
The low-volatility anomaly has been documented in the United States over an extended 90-year period. Volatility-sorted portfolios containing deep historical evidence since 1929 are available in an online data library The picture contains portfolio data for US stocks sorted on past volatility and grouped into ten portfolios. The portfolio of stocks with the lowest volatility has a higher return compared to the portfolio of stocks with the highest volatility. A visual illustration of the anomaly, since the relation between risk and return should be positive. Data for the related low-beta anomaly is also online available. The evidence of the anomaly has been mounting due to numerous studies by both academics and practitioners which confirm the presence of the anomaly throughout the forty years since its initial discovery in the early 1970s. Examples include Baker and Haugen ( 1991), Chan, Karceski and Lakonishok (1999),  Jagannathan and Ma (2003), Clarke De Silva and Thorley, (2006) and Baker, Bradley and Wurgler (2011). Besides evidence for the US stock market, there is also evidence for international stock markets. For global equity markets, Blitz and van Vliet (2007), Nielsen and Subramanian (2008), Carvalho, Xiao, Moulin (2011), Blitz, Pang, van Vliet (2012), Baker and Haugen (2012), all find similar results.

Explanations 
Several explanations have been put forward to explain the low-volatility anomaly. They explain why low risk securities are more in demand creating the low-volatility anomaly.

 Constraints: Investors face leverage constraints and shorting constraints. This explanation was put forward by Brennan (1971) and tested by Frazzini and Pederson (2014).
 Relative performance: Many investors want to consistently beat the market average, or benchmark as discussed by Blitz and van Vliet (2007) and Baker, Bradley, and Wurgler (2011).
 Agency issues: Many professional investors have misaligned interests when managing client money. Falkenstein (1996) and Karceski (2001) give evidence for mutual fund managers.
 Skewness preference: Many investors like lottery-like payoffs. Bali, Cakici and Whitelaw (2011) test the ‘stocks as lotteries’ hypothesis of Barberis and Huang (2008).
 Behavioral biases. Investors are often overconfident and use the representative heuristic and overpay for attention grabbing stocks. 

For an overview of all explanations put forward in the academic literature also see the survey article on this topic by Blitz, Falkenstein, and Van Vliet (2014) and Blitz, Van Vliet, and Baltussen (2019).

Also see 

 Market anomaly
 Capital asset pricing model
Low-volatility investing
Style investing
Value investing
Momentum investing

References

Behavioral finance
Finance theories
Mathematical finance
Financial markets
Portfolio theories
Financial economics